The Mayor of Chico, California is the chair of the City Council of Chico, California. The city of Chico has a council–manager form of local government. The city council holds its first meeting after the election of new and re-elected council members on the first Tuesday in December of even-numbered years. At this meeting, the mayor is chosen by and from among the members of the Chico City Council. The mayor serves for a term of two years. The office of mayor is a nonpartisan office. In the absence of both the Mayor and Vice Mayor, the Council may choose one of its members to act as Mayor Pro Tempore.

Presidents of the Board of Trustees (1872–1923) 
The city became incorporated on January 8, 1872. In that year, the first Chico Board of Trustees was established. This body was the predecessor of the modern Chico City Council, and its president acted as mayor. The first municipal election was February 5, 1872 with 217 votes cast for trustees elected at-large. Municipal elections were annual and the term for a trustee was two years. However, the first trustees had to draw lots to determine who would serve for a one, two or three-year term. This was to provide that there would only be either two or three seats up for election in any given year henceforth. The chair of the board was chosen by and from among the board's members and titled its President.

On April 12, 1897, the city had its first election under the ward system. Beginning in 1899, municipal elections would be only held every two years

Mayors from 1923 to 1996 
On June 4, 1921, an election was held to choose a Board of Freeholders charged with framing a City Charter. On April 16, 1923, at-large elections were reinstated under the charter. Under the charter, the board of trustees was renamed the Chico City Council, and its chair was titled the Mayor.

Mayors Pro Tempore (1996–1997) 
In 1996, the recently re-elected council member and Vice Mayor Ted Hubert died prior to being re-sworn in, and more significantly, before the selection of mayor had occurred. The evenly, and deeply divided council stalemated on the selection. At its first meeting on the first Tuesday in December, they named Ted Hubert as honorary mayor. However, the stalemate resulted in a rotating Mayor Pro Tempore system for about six months. The remaining six council members each took turns serving as meeting chair until they appointed Bill Johnston to fill the council vacancy, and Rick Keene mayor. During that period, the following council members served as Mayor Pro Tempore for about two weeks each:

Mayors from 1997 to the present

See also 
 History of Chico, California

Notes 
 In 1899, Mayor J. Ellis Rodley, was sentenced to 12 years in prison after being found guilty of perjury in the witnessing of a forged will offered for probate. He was granted parole in 1906.

References

Mayor
Chico mayors
Chico